Plectorhinchinae, is one of two subfamilies of the family Haemulidae, some known colloquially as sweetlips. This subfamily is regarded as having an Old World origin.

Genera
The following genera are included in the Plectorhinchinae:

Diagramma Oken, 1817
Genyatremus Gill, 1862
Parapristipoma Bleeker, 1873
Plectorhinchus Lacépède, 1801

Some authorities place the genus Genyatremus within the Haemulinae, although both Fishbase and Catalog of Fishes put this genus in the subfamily Plectorhinchinae.

References

Haemulidae